The Chaussée de Wavre or Waversesteenweg (Dutch) is a major street in Brussels, Belgium, running through the municipalities of Ixelles, Etterbeek and Auderghem. It starts at a crossroad with the / near the Namur Gate in Ixelles, goes down to the / in Etterbeek, then goes up to the La Chasse crossroad, continues to the Arsenal crossroad with the Greater Ring. After this crossroad, the street enters Auderghem, crosses the /, then merges with the European route E411 where it runs along the Red Cloister and then the Sonian Forest. At its end, the road crosses the Brussels Ring. This street is part of the N4 road, which connects Brussels to Arlon. It is named after the city of Wavre (Wallonia).

Several places of interest are located on the Chaussée de Wavre, among which the Vendôme cinema, the Royal Belgian Institute of Natural Sciences and the Jean-Félix Hap Garden.

See also

 List of streets in Brussels

Wavre
Auderghem
Etterbeek
Ixelles